Midale is a town in the rural municipality of Cymri No. 36, in the Canadian province of Saskatchewan. It is located on Highway 39, midway between the cities of Weyburn and Estevan. The population of Midale is 562.

Demographics 

Climate

Midale has a humid continental climate (Köppen Dfb).

This record stood for 84 years until June 27, 2021 when it was surpassed by Lytton, British Columbia, which reached .

Parks and recreation
Midale offers a variety of recreational venues. The local ice rink, Harry O Memorial Arena, is home to the Midale Mustangs of the men's senior Big 6 Hockey League. A team from Midale has won the Lincoln Trophy four times, once as the Miners in 1961 and three straight years as the Mustangs in the 2000s. The town also has a curling rink, museum, library, ball diamonds, and an outdoor swimming pool.

Twelve kilometres away is Mainprize Regional Park, which features an 18-golf course, camping, and swimming. Mainprize is on McDonald Lake, which is a man-made lake created in 1994 with the building of Rafferty Dam on the Souris River.

Notable people
 Brad Johner, country music singer-songwriter and musician
 Walt Ledingham, played in the NHL for the Chicago Black Hawks and New York Islanders

See also
 List of weather records
 Highway 702
 Weyburn-Midale Carbon Dioxide Project
 History of the petroleum industry in Canada

References

Towns in Saskatchewan
Cymri No. 36, Saskatchewan
Division No. 2, Saskatchewan